Sherry J. Yennello is an American nuclear chemist and an Elected Fellow of the American Association for the Advancement of Science. She is a Regents Professor and the holder of the Cyclotron Institute Bright Chair in Nuclear Science, who currently serves as the Director of the Cyclotron Institute at Texas A&M University. She is also a Fellow of the American Chemical Society and the American Physical Society. She has authored as well as co-authored more than 530 peer reviewed journal articles and has conducted many invited talks, presentations and seminars at several prestigious academic conferences and scholarly lectures.

Education 
Professor Yennello received a B.S. in Chemistry from Rensselaer Polytechnic Institute in 1985, following which she also received a B.S. in Physics in 1986. She continued her education with her Ph.D. studies in Nuclear Chemistry at Indiana University, where she also worked as an Associate Instructor. She completed her doctoral studies in 1990, and began her career as a post-doctoral Research Associate at the  National Superconducting Cyclotron Laboratory (NSCL) at Michigan State University.

Professional career 
In 1993, she joined Texas A&M University, College Station as an Assistant Professor in the Department of Chemistry. Her significant contributions to research and academia during her tenure at Texas A&M, led her to serve as the Program Director for Nuclear Physics for the National Science Foundation, for a period of two years from 2000 to 2002. She was appointed as an Associate Dean for Diversity for the College of Science at Texas A&M University in 2004, following which she also served as the Associate Dean for Faculty Affairs (2008 - 2014) and Associate Dean for Strategic Initiatives (2016 - 2018) for the same. She was awarded the title of Regents Professor by Texas A&M University in 2007. In 2014, she was named the Director of the Cyclotron Institute, which is a U.S. Department of Energy University Facility at Texas A&M, jointly supported by DoE and the State of Texas. Over the years, she has supervised and been a research adviser to more than 80 students, including post-doctoral research fellows, graduate and undergraduate students.

Research Interests 
Dr. Yennello's research interests include accelerator based heavy-ion reactions to study the dynamics and thermodynamics of excited nuclear matter and elucidate the nuclear equation of state, particularly the density dependence of the symmetry term, which has implications for the formation of elements and other astrophysical processes. The Yennello Research Group focuses on further constraining this density dependence using heavy-ion collisions. Utilizing the K500 and K150 cyclotrons, heavy-ion projectiles are accelerated to up to 40% the speed of light and collided with stationary targets. These reactions are important for studying structure, chemical composition, and the evolution of neutron stars and dynamics of supernovae explosions.

Awards 
Dr. Yennello's contributions to the domain of nuclear physics and chemistry has been well acknowledged internationally, and she has been the recipient of several prestigious awards and honors over the span of her career. Some of the prominent awards received by her are listed below:

 GE Foundation Faculty for the Future Award, 1993
 Oak Ridge Associate Universities Junior Faculty Enhancement Award, 1993
 NSF Young Investigator Award, 1994
 TAMU Center for Teaching Excellence Scholar, 1995
 Sigma Xi National Young Investigator Award, 2000
 University Faculty Fellow, 2000
 Women’s Spirit Month Award, 2002
 Fellow, American Physical Society, Elected 2005
 Regents Professor, 2007
 Association of Former Students Distinguished Award for Teaching – College Level, 2008
 ACS Francis P. Garvan – John M. Olin Medal, 2010.
 Outstanding Mentoring Award, Women’s Faculty Network, 2010
 Fellow, American Chemical Society, Elected 2011
 Association of Former Students Distinguished Award for Teaching – University Level, 2012
 Fellow, American Association for the Advancement of Science, Elected 2013
 Bright Chair in Nuclear Science, 2014
 APS Division of Nuclear Physics Mentoring Award, 2017
 Texas A&M University ACE Award, 2017
 Texas A&M College of Science LEAD Award, 2017

References

Year of birth missing (living people)
Living people
Fellows of the American Association for the Advancement of Science
21st-century American physicists
Texas A&M University faculty
Indiana University alumni
Michigan State University alumni